I, Frankenstein is a 2014 American science fantasy action film written and directed by Stuart Beattie, based on the digital-only graphic novel by Kevin Grevioux. An international co-production between the United States and Australia, the film was produced by Tom Rosenberg, Gary Lucchesi, Richard Wright, Andrew Mason and Sidney Kimmel. It stars Aaron Eckhart, Bill Nighy, Yvonne Strahovski, Miranda Otto and Jai Courtney. The film tells the story of Adam, Frankenstein's monster, who embarks on a dangerous journey to stop evil demons and their ruthless leader from taking over the world.

The film was released on January 24, 2014, in the United States and on March 20, 2014 in Australia. The film received negative reception, although Nighy's performance was praised, and was a box-office bomb, grossing $76 million worldwide against a production budget of $65 million.

Plot
In 1795, Doctor Victor Frankenstein creates a monster by putting together parts of corpses and reanimating them. Horrified by his creation, Frankenstein tries to destroy it, but the monster survives and murders his wife Elizabeth. Frankenstein chases it to the Arctic, but he succumbs to the cold weather. When the monster returns home to bury Frankenstein, it is attacked by demons, but is then rescued by two gargoyles, Ophir and Keziah. They bring it to a cathedral, where the monster meets the gargoyle queen Leonore and her second-in-command Gideon. Leonore explains that they were created by the Archangel Michael to battle demons on Earth and protect humanity. She names the creature "Adam" and invites him to join them, but he declines and chooses to depart. He is given baton-like weapons to protect himself, as more demons will come after him. The weapons allow him to "descend" demons (destroying their bodies and trapping their souls in Hell) as they have the symbol of the Gargoyle Order carved on them.

For the next two hundred years, Adam lives apart from society, killing any demon that pursues him and hiding from them. Deciding to rejoin society in the modern-day, Adam looks for and confronts a group of demons. During the fight, a police officer is accidentally killed. This causes Adam to be summoned by the gargoyles once more and they decide to imprison him as punishment. A demon Helek, who survived Adam's attack, reports to his leader, the demon prince Naberius, that Adam is alive. Naberius has disguised himself as billionaire businessman Charles Wessex and employs scientists Terra Wade and Carl Avery to conduct experiments to try to reanimate corpses. He sends a group of demons led by his most formidable warrior, Zuriel, to attack the gargoyles' cathedral and capture Adam so he can unlock the secret to resurrecting the dead.

In the attack, many demons are slain and 16 gargoyles, including Ophir and Keziah, are "ascended" (returned to and trapped in Heaven), but Zuriel sneaks in and captures Leonore and takes her to an abandoned theater. Adam interrogates a demon who tells him that they lured the gargoyles out in order to capture Leonore so they can force the gargoyles to trade Adam for her. Gideon is instructed to trade Adam to them; however, Adam escapes after the attack. Without Adam, Gideon instead offers to trade Frankenstein's journal for Leonore, which was found on Doctor Victor Frankenstein's body on the night they found him. At the theater, Gideon gives Zuriel the journal and Leonore is spared. Adam follows Zuriel to the Wessex Institute, where he discovers thousands of corpses underground and learns that Naberius plans to recreate Frankenstein's experiment by reanimating the corpses and using them as hosts for the descended demons so he can rebuild his armies and destroy humanity. Adam retrieves the journal from Terra and escapes the demons. He later tracks down Terra and asks for her help. The two are then attacked by Zuriel, where Adam fights him and manages to descend him.

Adam warns the remaining gargoyles of Naberius' plan, agreeing to give them the journal if they get him and Terra to safety. Leonore agrees and when Adam leaves, she secretly sends Gideon to kill him after he retrieves the journal. After a violent fight, Adam ascends Gideon and then decides to burn Frankenstein's journal and destroy its secrets before the gargoyles come after him. Luring them out of the cathedral, Adam leads them to the Wessex Institute, where they descend Naberius's right-hand man Dekar and then battle more demons. In the ensuing battle, Adam goes into the institute to rescue Terra, who had been kidnapped by Naberius and forced to begin the process of reanimating the corpses. Naberius overpowers Adam and tries to have one of the demon spirits possess him, but it doesn't work because Adam has developed a soul of his own. Adam carves the Gargoyle Order symbol on Naberius, descending him to Hell. The institute collapses and falls into an abyss, where all the demons and all the possessed corpses are destroyed and Naberius' plan is thwarted. Leonore rescues Adam and Terra from falling into the abyss as well and they return to the cathedral.

Leonore forgives Adam for Gideon's death and Adam bids farewell to Terra. In the ending scene, Adam narrates that he will continue defending the world from demons as he declares himself “Frankenstein.”

Cast
 Aaron Eckhart as Adam Frankenstein, a superhuman creature created by Dr. Frankenstein  
 Bill Nighy as Naberius, a demon prince who poses as Charles Wessex, head of the scientific Wessex Institute
 Yvonne Strahovski as Dr. Terra Wade, a world-renowned electrophysiologist employed by Naberius to research reanimation of dead matter
 Miranda Otto as Queen Leonore, the gargoyle queen
 Jai Courtney as Gideon, leader of the gargoyle army
 Socratis Otto as Zuriel, Naberius' most formidable warrior
 Kevin Grevioux as Dekar, a high-ranking demon who serves as the head of security at the Wessex Institute
 Goran D. Kleut as Rekem, a demon serving under Naberius who tries to capture Adam
 Steve Mouzakis as Helek, a demon serving under Naberius
 Mahesh Jadu as Ophir, a gargoyle
 Caitlin Stasey as Keziah, a gargoyle
 Chris Pang as Levi, a gargoyle
 Deniz Akdeniz as Barachel, a gargoyle
 Nicholas Bell as Dr. Carl Avery, a scientist working with Dr. Wade
 Bruce Spence as Molokai, the demonic doctor overseeing the corpses
 Aden Young as Dr. Victor Frankenstein, a scientist and Adam's creator

Production
Kevin Grevioux of Underworld sold the original screenplay to Lakeshore Entertainment in 2010. It is based on his Darkstorm Studios digital graphic novel of the same name. Lakeshore, an independent Los Angeles production company which also produced the Underworld films, brought Stuart Beattie on board to re-write and direct in early 2011. In November 2011, it was confirmed that filming would take place in Melbourne and that Australia's Hopscotch Features would co-produce the film with Lakeshore. The movie's visual effects budget was $6 million.

It was announced on October 7, 2011 that Aaron Eckhart would play the lead role. Eckhart described his character thus: "Frankenstein is an intelligent, evolved man, and that’s how he is portrayed in this movie, for sure." In November 2011, Yvonne Strahovski was cast as the female lead, a scientist working to reanimate the dead, while Miranda Otto was cast as the queen of the gargoyles. Bill Nighy plays the film's villain, whom he described as a "Nasty piece of work; one of the angels descended with Satan." Eckhart and Otto trained for three months with martial arts experts Ron Balicki and Diana Lee Inosanto in the Filipino martial art of Kali for their fight scenes.

Principal photography began on February 27, 2012, based at Docklands Studios Melbourne. Filming occurred in Victoria, Australia over a period of ten weeks, with multiple scenes being filmed at Ormond College. The film created over 500 jobs for cast and crew.

Release
The North American release was originally set for February 22, 2013, and later moved to September 13, 2013. In April 2013 the release date was pushed back again, and saw its world premiere in Buenos Aires on January 20, 2014, after which it was released in 23 countries between January 22 and January 24. It was released in a further nine countries between January 29 and January 31. In February 2013, it was announced the film would be released in 3D. On September 17, 2013, it was announced that the film would be digitally re-mastered and released in the IMAX format.

Home media
I, Frankenstein was released on DVD and Blu-ray on May 13, 2014.

Reception

Critical response
On Rotten Tomatoes, it has a 5% approval rating based on 104 reviews, with an average rating of 3.24/10. The site's general consensus is: "Loud, incoherent, and dramatically listless, I, Frankenstein is a remarkably dull fantasy adventure that fails to generate much excitement or interest in its characters." On Metacritic, the film holds a score of 30 out of 100, based on reviews from 20 critics, indicating "generally unfavorable reviews". Audiences surveyed by CinemaScore gave the film a grade "B" on scale of A to F.

Mike McCahill of The Guardian gave the film 2 stars and Total Film also gave it 2 stars.

Box office
In the United States and Canada, the film was released in a total of 2,763 theaters of which 3D and IMAX comprised 95% of the total theaters. It earned $8.6 million in its opening weekend, which was below expectations. About 65% of the grosses came from 3D showings. It had a successful opening in Russia with $6.3 million from 1,846 screens. At the end of its theatrical run, the film grossed a total of $19 million in North America and $57 million elsewhere, for a worldwide total of $76.8 million surpassing its $65 million budget.

Potential sequels and Underworld crossover
Much doubt has been cast over a sequel due to the film's lackluster box office performance, though Kevin Grevioux, creator of the graphic novel and the Underworld film series, had earlier expressed interest in making more I, Frankenstein films along with an Underworld crossover film. He stated in a pre-release interview that, in an early draft of his screenplay, Kate Beckinsale would have made a post-credits cameo appearance as Selene and that there would have been Underworld Easter eggs, but none of this was used.

See also
 List of films featuring Frankenstein's monster
 Frankenstein; or, The Modern Prometheus, 1818 Mary Shelley novel

References

External links

 
 
 
 
 

2014 films
2014 3D films
2014 science fiction action films
2010s monster movies
American science fantasy films
American science fiction action films
American science fiction thriller films
Australian action adventure films
Australian fantasy films
Australian science fiction action films
Australian science fiction thriller films
Demons in film
Films based on American comics
Films directed by Stuart Beattie
Films produced by Gary Lucchesi
Films produced by Sidney Kimmel
Films produced by Tom Rosenberg
Films scored by Reinhold Heil
Films scored by Johnny Klimek
Films with screenplays by Stuart Beattie
Films shot in Melbourne
Frankenstein films
Gargoyles in popular culture
IMAX films
Lakeshore Entertainment films
Sidney Kimmel Entertainment films
2010s English-language films
2010s American films